Webbo District (Nyaake) was a district of River Gee County, Liberia.

References

 

Districts of Liberia
River Gee County